Doğankent is a town and a district of Giresun Province in the Black Sea region of Turkey.

Geography
Doğankent is a hilly district in the valley of the Harşit. The climate is typical of the Black Sea region, with much rain, summer and winter. 

Doğankent has 3,383 residents and provides high schools and other basic amenities to the surrounding villages.

Etymology
Previously known as Kürtün-ü Zir, Manastır Bükü and Harşit.

History
There was a monastery here in the Byzantine period, hence the earlier name. The area was settled by Seljuk Turks following their victory over the Byzantines at the Battle of Malazgirt and was then absorbed into the Ottoman Empire in 1461 by Sultan Mehmet II during his conquest of the rump-Byzantine Empire of Trebizond. The areas importance as a centre of education persisted as the monasteries were converted into Islamic medrese.

See also
Güvenlik Tunnel

References

External links
(follow resim, resimler or foto galeri in the Turkish websites for pictures)
 the municipality
  the district governorate
  local information

Populated places in Giresun Province
Districts of Giresun Province
Towns in Turkey